Xeneboda is a genus of moths belonging to the family Tortricidae.

Species
Xeneboda congo Razowski, 2012
Xeneboda kumasiana Razowski & Tuck, 2000 
Xeneboda mayumbea Razowski, 2012

References

 , 2005: World Catalogue of Insects vol. 5 Tortricidae.
 , 2012: Tortricidae (Lepidoptera) from the Tervuren Museum: 1. Tortricini and Chlidanotini. Polish Journal of Entomology 81 (2): 129-143. Abstract and full article: .

External links
tortricidae.com

Polyorthini
Tortricidae genera
Taxa named by Józef Razowski